Koshiro Tanaka (田中小四郎) is a Japanese martial artist and veteran of the Soviet-Afghan war. Tanaka wanted to leave his dull job and see if he would ever fear death. He travelled to Afghanistan and fought as a mujahideen.

Early life

Koshiro Tanaka was born in 1940 in Tagawa (Fukuoka Prefecture). He studied karate from childhood, and then judo and kendo. Growing up, Tanaka became a businessman, but gradually came to the idea that the business of his life was martial arts. He graduated from Kanagawa University Faculty of Law and Economics. He decided the best “test site” for his spirit and body would be civil war-torn Afghanistan.

Afghanistan

In 1985, while sitting in his office at Tokyo's Shinjuku district he talked of preparations to go to Afghanistan. He would finance himself. He traveled to Peshawar, the capital of Pakistan's Northwest Frontier Province. He carried 10 thousand dollars to distribute to the mujahideen. He raised the money from his company. Peshawar was the seat of the Afghanistan resistance movement. Seven Muslim guerilla parties had their headquarters there. Peshawar was then home to more than 3 million Afghan refugees. Tanaka joined Jamiat-e Islam which was the second largest mujahideen group, headed by Burhanuddin Rabbani. As he prepared to depart to Afghanistan, his wife Takiko stood beside him and showed support but wanted him to stay. She admitted she didn't understand her husband's attraction to the mujahideen.

The mujahideen, he said, "need help, any kind of help. They need weapons, bread, food, anything". Koshiro Tanaka was in Afghanistan, He exchanged his Black Uniform suit, for a salwar kameez and converted to Islam. He had no battlefield experience but nonetheless, he began to teach the mujahideen hand-to-hand combat. February 1985, he fought against the Soviet army and pro-Soviet government army in Afghanistan with the Kalashnikov AK-47 and RPG-7. Many journalists around the world reported on "Afghan samurai". Afterwards, he became the managing director of the Japan Freedom Afghanistan Association, the secretary general of the International Refugee Relief Committee, and succeeded the second Soke of Fuji Fluid Art in 1991, servig until 2007. In 2008, he launched his own school, "Hiko School".

Japanese Government
the Japanese government disapproved of his activities. The Japanese Embassy in Islamabad officially warned Tanaka about the inappropriateness of involvement in the Afghan conflict. Tanaka ignored this warning and began to train the Dushmans of the second largest group headed by Rabbani. He eventually viewed himself as a martyr for Japan, which had an Island dispute with the Soviet Union. Tanaka was strongly against the government and Constitution for denying Japanese people the chance to fight the Russians off the Kuril Islands to which Japan had historical ties to. The Islands were lost to the Soviets.

References

1940 births
Living people